Madison Center is a census-designated place (CDP) comprising the primary village and surrounding residential land in the town of Madison, New Haven County, Connecticut, United States. It is in the southern part of the town, surrounding the intersection of U.S. Route 1 with Connecticut Route 79 (Durham Road). The CDP extends south to Long Island Sound, north to Interstate 95, east to Fence Creek, and west to Long Shore Land and Stony Lane.

As of the 2010 census, the CDP had a population of 2,290, out of 18,269 in the entire town of Madison.

References 

Census-designated places in New Haven County, Connecticut
Census-designated places in Connecticut